Andrew Leung Kwan-yuen  (born 24 February 1951) is a Hong Kong politician who is the current President of the Legislative Council of Hong Kong (Legco), representing the Industrial (First) functional constituency. From October 2012 to October 2016, he was the chairman of Business and Professionals Alliance for Hong Kong (BPA), the second largest party in the legislature.

Early life and education
Leung was born on 24 February 1951 to a family who run a textile factory, the Sun Hing knitting company. He was educated in the University of Leeds and joined his father's family business. In 1970, he set up the Sun Hing Knitting Factory in Kwai Chung and became the chairman of the company.

Public service career
Leung joined the Hong Kong Woollen & Synthetic Knitting Manufacturers' Association, the chamber of commerce of the manufacturing companies, in which he later became the honorary president in 1997. He has been the chairman and Honorary Chairman of the Textile Council of Hong Kong and the member, Deputy chairman and Chairman of the Federation of Hong Kong Industries. He stepped down in 2004 after he was elected to the Legislative Council of Hong Kong and became the Honorary chairman.

He has been the committee member of both Textile and Clothing Industry Training Board in the 1980s, and became a member of Vocational Training Council (VTC) board of directors in 1998, he was then appointed as the chairman of VTC from 2006 to 2012. He has also held many positions including Chairman of the Hong Kong Productivity Council (2003–2009), council member of the Hong Kong Trade Development Council (2010–2016), a member of the Economic Development Commission (2013–2017), the Deputy Chairman of the Business Facilitation Advisory Committee (2012–2016), a non-executive director of the Mandatory Provident Fund Schemes Authority (2009–2015) and a Director of The Hong Kong Mortgage Corporation Limited.

He was awarded Justice of the Peace in 1996 and Member of the Order of the British Empire (MBE) for his services to the textile industry in 1997.

Legislative Councillor
In the 2004 Legislative Council election, he replaced Kenneth Ting Woo-shou to be elected uncontestedly to the Legislative Council of Hong Kong through the Industrial (First) functional constituency which was elected by the Federation of Hong Kong Industries, representing the Liberal Party.

Leung split apart from the Liberal Party in October 2008 with Jeffrey Lam Kin-fung and Sophie Leung Lau Yau-fun after the defeat of the party in the 2008 Legislative Council election in September and the resignation of chairman James Tien Pei-chun. In June 2009, the three legislators formed the Economic Synergy which later co-founded the Business and Professionals Alliance for Hong Kong (BPA) in 2012 which Leung became the founding Chairman of the new party.

Leung was also the committee member of 11th National Committee of the Chinese People's Political Consultative Conference. He received the Silver Bauhinia Star (SBS) and the Gold Bauhinia Star (GBS) in 2004 and 2010 respectively.

On the debate over the 2014–15 Hong Kong electoral reform for the universal suffrage of the Chief Executive of Hong Kong, Leung opposed to the Occupy Central with Love and Peace campaign by the pan-democracy camp, appealed to the "silent majority" to oppose "Occupy protest". Leung said the campaign would threaten the rule of law and social stability, while hurting Hong Kong's business environment.

President of the Legislative Council

After the 2016 Hong Kong Legislative Election, Leung was handpicked by the pro-Beijing camp to be their candidate for the President of the Legislative Council of Hong Kong left over by the retiring Jasper Tsang, after potential candidates New People's Party's Michael Tien and nonpartisan Paul Tse withdrew their nominations, implicitly citing the influence of the Liaison Office. Leung was questioned by the opposition over his British nationality which he renounced right before the vote and his close business ties with 11 companies in which he held shares and was the directors of seven of them. On the first meeting of the Legislative Council, Leung was elected as president in the middle of chaos as the pan-democrats and localists tore up their ballot papers and stormed out of the meeting room before the vote. As a result, Leung received 38 votes against pro-democrat nominee James To's zero with three blank ballots.

On 27 October, Leung was slammed and asked to step down after he took a U-turn by deciding to delay the oath-taking of Sixtus Leung and Yau Wai-ching of Youngspiration whose qualifications were under legal challenge by the government for their pro-independence on general meeting on 27 October 2016. Leung and Yau inserted their own words into the oath-taking on the first session of the Legislative Council and therefore were invalidated by the LegCo secretary-general Kenneth Chen. Andrew Leung initially allowed the two to retake the oaths but backed down after the pro-Beijing camp threatened to stage a second walkout after they walked out in the on 19 October to block the two Youngspiration legislators to take the oaths. The pan-democracy camp criticised Leung for "unfit to perform his role".

In November 2020, following the expulsion of 4 pro-democracy lawmakers from the Legislative Council, Leung said that he "respects and understands" their disqualification. 

In February 2021, after Xia Baolong said that only "patriots" could be part of the Hong Kong government, Leung agreed and said it was the "most basic and reasonable" requirement for those in the government. Additionally, Leung claimed that "I am sure that all the Hong Kong people will have a say... As long as you are patriotic, you can have any views."

In January 2022, the mainland Chinese national emblem was permanently added to the Legislative Council chamber, after Andrew Leung, Starry Lee Wai-king and Ma Fung-kwok decided that it should be made permanent. Andrew Leung had earlier said it would be only temporary for the swearing in of lawmakers, but reversed course.

In December 2022, after only "patriots" were allowed to administer Hong Kong, Leung denied that lawmakers were simply rubber stamping legislation, stating "We need to work together to make sure the legislative process is smooth. Smooth doesn't mean rubber stamp."

In January 2023, Leung criticized a decision by the UK to not allow Legislative Council members to attend the Commonwealth Parliamentary Association UK’s seminar, saying that the event had "blatant political bias."

Personal life
His wife, Susana Cheong Suk-hing, is the sister of former member of the Legislative Council Stephen Cheong.

In August 2022, Leung and his son, Clarence Leung Wang-ching, the Under Secretary for Home and Youth Affairs, were deemed close contacts after a family member tested positive for COVID-19. However on December, Leung was tested positive for COVID-19.

See also
 Federation of Hong Kong Industries
 Industrial (First)

References

External links
Members' Biographies of Andrew Leung Kwan-yuen on legislative council site

1951 births
Living people
Hong Kong businesspeople
Hong Kong industrialists
Hong Kong racehorse owners and breeders
Liberal Party (Hong Kong) politicians
Members of the Order of the British Empire
Recipients of the Silver Bauhinia Star
Recipients of the Gold Bauhinia Star
Economic Synergy politicians
Business and Professionals Alliance for Hong Kong politicians
Members of the National Committee of the Chinese People's Political Consultative Conference
Members of the Election Committee of Hong Kong, 1998–2000
Members of the Election Committee of Hong Kong, 2000–2005
Leaders of political parties
Alumni of the University of Leeds
HK LegCo Members 2004–2008
HK LegCo Members 2008–2012
HK LegCo Members 2012–2016
HK LegCo Members 2016–2021
HK LegCo Members 2022–2025
21st-century Hong Kong politicians
Presidents of the Legislative Council of Hong Kong